Darrell Vreugdenhil (born April 23, 1949) is an American rower. He competed in the men's coxed pair event at the 1976 Summer Olympics.

References

1949 births
Living people
American male rowers
Olympic rowers of the United States
Rowers at the 1976 Summer Olympics
People from Mitchell, South Dakota
Pan American Games medalists in rowing
Pan American Games gold medalists for the United States
Pan American Games silver medalists for the United States
Rowers at the 1975 Pan American Games
Rowers at the 1979 Pan American Games
Rowers at the 1983 Pan American Games